The Northwest News Network is a network of radio stations based in the Pacific Northwest region of the United States. It has 61 member stations in the states of Idaho, Oregon, and Washington. The network was founded in 2003 and has been headquartered in Portland, Oregon, since 2008.

Members

Partner stations
Coast Community Radio (Astoria, Oregon)
Jefferson Public Radio (Ashland, Oregon)
KBCS (Bellevue, Washington)
KLCC (Eugene, Oregon)
KNKX (Tacoma, Washington)
KSVR (Mount Vernon, Washington)
KUOW (Seattle, Washington)
KWSO (Warm Springs, Oregon)
Northwest Public Radio
Oregon Public Broadcasting
Spokane Public Radio

References

External links

Radio stations in Idaho
Radio stations in Oregon
Radio stations in Washington (state)
2003 establishments in the United States